Julia Fletcher, sometimes credited as Julia DeMita, is an American voice actress. Among her roles are the Instructor (narrator) in The Second Renaissance, Elma and Yunalesca in Final Fantasy X, Carmila in Vampire Hunter D: Bloodlust, Scaphandra and Judy in Æon Flux, Olmpias in the first four episodes of Reign: The Conqueror, and Orphan in Final Fantasy XIII. She is married to voice actor John DeMita.

Dubbing roles

Anime
Dragon Slayer – Princess
Final Fantasy: Legend of the Crystals – Mid
Golgo 13: Queen Bee – Nursemaid
Kiki's Delivery Service – Ket's Aunt, Ket's Mother (Disney version)
Naruto – Haruna
Ninja Scroll – Nekome, Azami, Utsushiei
Pet Shop of Horrors – Jill, Mrs. Hayworth
Psycho Diver: Soul Siren – Kyoko Ayuhara
Reign: The Conqueror – Olympias
Tekkaman Blade II – Aki Kisaragi, Dead-End
Tenchi Muyo! – Nagi (Tenchi Universe)
The Animatrix - The Second Renaissance – The Instructor
Twilight of the Dark Master – Chan Long 
Vampire Hunter D: Bloodlust – Carmilla
Vampire Princess Miyu – Maiko Yanagihara, Mrs. Oshima, Narrator

Video games
Final Fantasy X – Elma
Final Fantasy X-2 – Elma
Final Fantasy XII – Judge Drace
Final Fantasy XIII – Orphan (Shell form, female half)
Project Sylpheed – Doris Egan
Valkyria Chronicles – Eleanor Varrot
Valkyria Chronicles II – Eleanor Varrot, Rene Randall

Filmography

Animation
Æon Flux – Scraphandra, Judy, Additional voices
The Chronicles of Riddick: Dark Fury – Merc Squad Leader

Awards and nominations
Ovation Awards
 2009: Nominated for Lead Actress in a Play for the role of Anna in the Andak Stage Company production of "The Letters"

References

External links
 
 

Living people
American video game actresses
American voice actresses
Place of birth missing (living people)
20th-century American actresses
21st-century American actresses
Year of birth missing (living people)